October Rust is the fourth studio album by Type O Negative. It was released in 1996. This is the first album with Johnny Kelly credited as the band's drummer, although programmed drums are used on the album. October Rust has more ballads and less of the doom metal sound of previous or subsequent albums. It also features a very heavy cover of Neil Young's "Cinnamon Girl".

It is the first of the band's albums with a "joke intro"; in this case, "Bad Ground", which is 38 seconds of low-level buzzing, meant to sound as if one or more audio leads is incorrectly plugged into the input jacks of an amplifier. Tracks 2 and 15 are humorous untitled spoken word intros and outros to the album, respectively, with the band downplaying the recording of the album. Another production technique employed on the album is the use of very abrupt endings and segues to a few of the songs, heard on the tracks "Green Man", "Red Water", and "Haunted".

Track listing

Credits

Type O Negative
 Peter Steele – lead vocals, bass guitar
 Kenny Hickey – backing vocals, acoustic guitar, electric guitar
 Josh Silver – backing vocals, keyboards, synthesizer, sound effects, programming
 Johnny Kelly – drums, percussion (programmed drums)

Additional personnel
 Val Ium – backing vocals (on "In Praise of Bacchus")

Production
 Mike Marciano - recording engineer
 George Marino - mastering
 Sagmeister Inc. - cover art
 Tim Fitzharris - photography
 Joseph Cultice - photography
 Tobias Frere Jones - typography
 Laura Michaels - design

Reception 
October Rust was well received by critics. In 2017, former Black Sabbath drummer Bill Ward ranked October Rust as one of his favorite Metal albums of all time.

Charts

Certifications

References

1996 albums
Type O Negative albums